Maria B is a Pakistani clothing brand which was founded by Maria Butt. It is based in Lahore, Pakistan. The clothing includes ready-to-wear, unstitched, and haute couture.

Maria B has worked with Pakistani celebrities Ayeza Khan, Alizeh Shah, Iqra Aziz, Sana Javed, Hina Altaf, Maya Ali, Sajal Ali, Aiman Khan, Minal Khan, Mehwish Hayat, Mawra Hocane, Urwa Hocane, Samina Ahmed and Aima Baig. It has also collaborated internationally with stars from the famous Turkish Historical Fiction Drama, Diriliş: Ertuğrul. Didem Balçın (Selcan Hatun) and Gülsim Ali (Aslihan Hatun) were featured for the 2020-21 Linen and Lawn campaigns respectively. In 2021, Maria B launched Pakistan's first culturally collaborative campaign with the ethereal Ayeza Khan and Gülsim Ali. It aimed to unite the two sister cultures under the banner of Islam and their rich, intertwined history. It thus claimed the title #BrandPakistan, which aims to promote cultural positivity and appreciation by hyphenating the similarities and embracing the differences of Turkey and Pakistan and their people.

In 2017, it announced to incorporate Swarovski's crystals in its embroidered chiffon and lawn collections.

History
The business was started by Maria Butt, a graduate of the Pakistan Institute of Fashion and Design in 1999 in Lahore, Pakistan. She was part of the first graduating batch and maintained her position as the best student for all 4 years of fashion school. A prominent fashion magazine called Maria Butt the Coco Chanel of Pakistan. At the start, she only had one shop and few stitching machines. She launched her business with a small investment, aiming to expand the brand slowly. Maria B is now the largest fashion designer brand of prêt a porter, couture, formal wear, lawn, embroidered fabrics, linen, and cotton in Pakistan.

Collections

Swarovski pret collection
In 2016, Maria B became the first designer in Pakistan who incorporated the Austrian-based global leader of crystals Swarovski in their embroidered, chiffon and lawn collections. They signed their deal in 2014 with the Austrian giant.

The collection was launched on 27 August 2016.

Other brands
Maria B is known for the following brands:
 Mkids
 MPrints
 Evening Wear
 Lawn
 Linen
 MBasics
 Mbroidered
 Maria B Jewellery
 Maria B Perfumes
 Sateen 
 Silk
 Eid Lawn
 Casuals
 Couture
 Bridals

Stores
Maria B has stores in all major cities of Pakistan:

Sindh
 Karachi
 Hyderabad

Punjab
 Lahore
 Faisalabad
 Islamabad
 Rawalpindi
 Multan
 Sialkot
 Gujranwala
 Sargodha
 Bahawalpur

Kyber Paktunkhwa
 Peshawar
 Mardan

Balochistan
 Quetta

References

Clothing brands of Pakistan
Companies based in Lahore
Clothing companies of Pakistan
Clothing companies established in 1999
Clothing retailers of Pakistan
Pakistani companies established in 1999